Víctor Serralde Martínez (December 18, 1971 in Córdoba, Veracruz, Mexico) is a Mexican politician member of the National Action Party, Federal Deputy for the Thirteenth Federal Electoral District of Veracruz in the Legislature LXII Congress from day 1 September 2012 to conclude on August 3, 2015.

Appointed by the full Congress on October 16, 2012 as president of the Rural Development Commission, a position he will hold until August 3, 2015.

References

External links 
 Facebook profile

Living people
1971 births
Politicians from Veracruz
National Action Party (Mexico) politicians
21st-century Mexican politicians